Murder Most Unladylike is a 2014 children's mystery novel by British-American author Robin Stevens. It follows two schoolgirls in 1930s England solving their first murder mystery and is the first book in the 'Murder Most Unladylike' series.

The story is written in the style of a casebook and follows two fictional boarding schoolgirl detectives, Daisy Wells and Hazel Wong, as they try to find the murderer of their science teacher. The book has been nominated for several awards, including the Carnegie Medal. In the US, the book was published under the name Murder is Bad Manners.

Plot

The two principal characters, Hazel Wong and Daisy Wells are students in Deepdean School for Girls. They are the founding members of their school's Detective Society and its only members. Daisy is the president of the detective society and Hazel is its secretary and vice president.  Near the beginning of the book, Hazel stumbles upon the corpse of their Science teacher, Miss Bell, in the gymnasium, seemingly fallen from the balcony...but when Hazel returns with Daisy and one of the prefects, the body is gone. Thus, none of the characters believes that Hazel saw Miss Bell's dead body and believes that she was telling lies.

Then, the next day at Prayers, the other students also notice the absence of their science mistress, but they are satisfied when the headteacher informed them that she has received a resignation letter from Miss Bell. Following this, Miss Tennyson has also died. A note was beside her corpse, stating that the murderer was sorry, but she knew she had to do it. Daisy and Hazel, however, are not. They work tirelessly to piece the clues together and solve the mystery.

Towards the end of the book, Hazel and Daisy come across an old notebook, which turns out to be the diary of another character Verity Abraham, the girl who was rumored in the story to have committed suicide by jumping off the Gym  balcony the term before Hazel arrived . The diary serves as evidence that Miss Griffin, the headmistress has spoken to her a few weeks ago and informed her that she was Verity's true mother and that Mr. and Mrs. Abraham had adopted her. Miss Griffin had become an unmarried mother, which at the time was not considered normal and would have affected her chances of becoming headmistress. Verity forbids this fact, but Miss Griffin then provides her with evidence of her birth and the adoption, too. Then, she asks Verity to join her as her daughter, but Verity denies it and says Mr. and Mrs. Abraham are her parents. Afterwards, Verity had received a note from Miss Griffin, which was found in the diary. Then, after she met Miss Griffin, she disappeared, which was when Verity was said to have committed suicide. Following this, there is a note proving who the murderer is at the end, written by Miss Bell. Miss Griffin would have disposed of it if not for Miss Bell hiding it.

As there are police at the scene, they hand the diary over, the policeman understands everything and holds a denouement (the final part of the book, unveiling the murderer) and they finally arrest the murderer.

Reception
In its review, The Oxford Times praised Stevens for her "sense of place ... attention to detail, in-depth characters, authentic documents of events and, most importantly, absorbing plot". The website Crime Review called Murder Most Unladylike "an assured and capable debut",. Children's author Jo Cotterill called it "extremely well plotted", but criticized the pacing of the story. The education website Teachwire said the book is "something that is simultaneously recognisable and totally original".

It also won a 2015 Waterstones Children's Book Prize in the 5-12 Fiction category.

Sequel and Series 
A sequel, Arsenic For Tea, was published seven months after Murder Most Unladylike. Since the first Murder Most Unladylike book, there have been ten subsequent books, along with four extra mini-books. In 2022, a new series, The Ministry of Unladylike Affairs was released, featuring characters related to those in the Murder Most Unladylike series. 
 Murder most Unladylike (2014)
 Arsenic For Tea (2015)
 First Class Murder (2015)
 Jolly Foul Play (2016)
 Mistletoe and Murder (2016)
 Cream Buns and Crime (2017)
 A Spoonful of Murder (2018)
 Death in the Spotlight (2018)
 Top Marks for Murder (2019)
 Death Sets Sail (2020)
 Once Upon A Crime (2021)
Extras:
 The Case Of The Deepdean Vampire (2016)
 The Case Of The Blue Violet (2016)           
 The Case Of The Missing Treasure (2019)
 The Case Of The Drowned Pearl (2020)

References

2014 children's books
2014 British novels
Children's mystery novels
British children's novels
British mystery novels
Novels set in boarding schools
2014 debut novels
Puffin Books books